Otoyol 1, abbreviated as O-1 and locally referred to as Freeway 1, is a controlled access highway in Istanbul, Turkey. The O-1 serves as the inner freeway and is one of three freeways in the city, the others being the O-2, and O-7, as well as connecting the European and Asian parts of the city via the Bosphorus Bridge. 

It starts Osmaniye neighborhood in Bakırköy district on the European part, runs through the city over the Golden Horn and the Bosphorus, and terminates in Söğütlüçeşme neighborhood of Kadıköy district on the Asian part. Otoyol 1 is toll-free, however the Bosporus Bridge is a toll bridge in the eastward direction only, having its toll plaza at the Asian side. The O-1 is connected via three feeder highways to The Second Beltway.

Exit list

See also
 List of highways in Turkey

References

External links
Istanbul road map

Transport in Istanbul Province
01
Fatih
Beyoğlu
Şişli
Beşiktaş
Transport in Kadıköy
Üsküdar
Bakırköy
Eyüp
Kağıthane